Marko Ciboci is a Croatian dance artist and International dance adjudicator.

Biography 

He was born in Zagreb, Croatia in 1981, his family name is from an Italian noble family from the City of Gorizia, Italy. He has finished his master's degree  at the University of Zagreb.

Dance career 
During his competitive dance career, he was the winner of many local and international dance competitions in Latin & Ballroom dances. In his professional career, he was a six times professional Croatian Champion in Latin dances, in 2009, 2010, 2011 with his Russian dance partner Polina Golubeva and in 2015, 2016, 2017 with his Croatian dance partner Anja Lopert. In 2018 he has become the finalist of the World Cup Theater Arts in Kremlin, Moscow along with his Russian dance partner Alexandra Akimova.

Activities 
In 2017 he has become the founder and the elected President of the National Dance Council of Croatia. In 2018 he become co-founder of the European Dance Organization  and European Dance Tour. In 2018 he was elected as the President  of the European Dance Council upon the retirement of the former president Rudolf Trautz.

Marko Ciboci is a founder and organizer of international dance events: ADRIATIC PEARL - Dubrovnik, in Dubrovnik, Croatia, World Pro-Am Superstars, Revelin, Dubrovnik, Croatia, Zagreb Christmas Ball, Zagreb, Croatia, Montenegro Star Ball, Budva, Montenegro, Princess Ball & Karl Breuer Cup, Bangkok, Thailand, Dance Prestige - Nuit de la Dansa, Paris, France, Adriatic Royal Pearl - Opatija, Croatia.

He is also a founder of a Zagreb City Youth Program DANCE AGAINST VIOLENCE.

Marko is a co-founder of a European dance franchise, DANCE WITH STYLE.

Media career

Dancing with the Stars 
Marko was one of four judges in TV Reality Show "Dancing with the Stars" in Croatia (Ples sa zvijezdama) in Season 10 and 11 broadcast by NOVA TV in 2022 and 2023.

References 

Croatian male dancers
1981 births
Dancers from Zagreb
University of Zagreb alumni
Ballroom dancers
Ples sa Zvezdama
Living people